Psychromonas antarctica is a species of Pseudomonadota.<ref>{{cite journal | vauthors = Ivanova EP, Flavier S, ((Christen R.)) | title = Phylogenetic relationships among marine Alteromonas-like proteobacteria: Emended description of the family Alteromonadaceae and proposal of Pseudoalteromonadaceae fam. nov., Colwelliaceae fam. nov., Shewanellaceae fam. nov., Moritellaceae fam. nov., Ferrimonadaceae fam. nov., Idiomarinaceae fam. nov. and Psychromonadaceae fam. nov. | journal = Int. J. Syst. Evol. Microbiol. | year = 2004 | volume = 54 | issue = Pt 5 | pages = 1773–1788| doi = 10.1099/ijs.0.02997-0 | pmid = 15388743 }}</ref> The halophilic and psychrophile bacterium was first isolated from a salinity pond in Antarctica.Psychromonas antarctica is anaerobic but tolerates the presence of oxygen (aerotolerant). It is motile with a polar flagellum.

 Genomic Sequence 
It was reported that a draft of the full genome sequence had been completed, in April 2022. The report states that the sequencing was performed on DNA extracted from Psychromonas antarctica'' strain DSM 10704. 300 contigs were assembled, with a total length of 3,916,717 bp (base pairs), and 95x coverage. The GenBank master record can be found here, and the sequence read archive can be found here.

References

External links
 J.P. Euzéby: List of Prokaryotic names with Standing in Nomenclature - Genus Psychromonas
Type strain of Psychromonas antarctica at BacDive -  the Bacterial Diversity Metadatabase

Alteromonadales
Bacteria described in 2004